Machhiwara is one of the developing cities in the Ludhiana district of the Indian state of Punjab. Machhiwara is famous for Gurudwara Sri Charan Kanwal Sahib associated with Guru Gobind Singh ji and named after the Guru's feet that are compared to the lotus flower. And It is also famous for Religious Hindu Sri Shivala Bramchari Temple associated with the Pandavas of Dvapara Yuga (time of Lord Krishna) .

The Ghorewaha were given the title of Mian by Emperor Jehangir. During Emperor Akbar’s time, the Ghorewaha Raja was Rana Udho II, The Raja of Machiwara, Rana Udho actively assisted Emperor Akbar in his fight for the Delhi Throne, he captured the rebellious Bairam Khan and subsequently the Raja was allowed to retain the Jagir of Rahon worth 750 villages. The division of the Ghorewaha country took place after Rana Udho’s death when all the Branches were Hindu, including that of the famed Rai Rup Chand. The principal Jagirs were taken, Rahon by the Tikka and Jadla by Bhoj Singh, who returned from Jaipur.

History
Machhiwara name came from machhi (fish) + wara (ground). Satluj River runs 13 km away from Machhiwara.

Battle of Machhiwara (15 May 1555) between Humayun and Afghans
When Humayun was struggling to regain his power on India, Humayun captured Lahore in February 1555. Another detachment of his forces captured Dipalpur. Next, the Mughal army occupied Jalandhar and their advanced division proceeded towards Sirhind. Sikandar Shah Suri sent a force of 30,000 horses with Naseeb Khan and Tatar Khan, but they were defeated by the Mughal Army in a Battle at Machhiwara.

Guru Gobind Singh and Machhiwara
When Mughal Emperor Aurangzeb's army attacked the fortress of Chamkaur Sahib, Guru Gobind Singh successfully resisted their onslaught and fled into the forests of Machhiwara. The Mughal forces got wind of his whereabouts. Guru Gobind Singh was saved by two of his Muslim Pashtun devotees who disguised him as their Muslim prophet.

The place where Guru Gobind Singh rested is where the Gurudwara stands today. There are four gurudwaras (Sikh temples) in Machhiwara. When Guru Gobind Singh was in Machhiwara, he wrote "Mitar pyare nu haal murida da akhda" (Say hello to my dear friend) in the forest of Machhiwara.

Machhiwara is a famous destination for Sikh pilgrims. On 13 April every year there is a festival of Vaisakhi. Another Sikh religious festival of Sabha is held on 21–23 December every year.

Geography
It has an average elevation of 262 metres (859 feet).

Machhiwara is 38 km northeast of Ludhiana city and 69 km west of the capital city of Chandigarh. It lies only 9 km from Samrala, which is on the Ludhiana Chandigarh highway.

Demographics
 India census, Machhiwara had a population of 24,916. Males constitute 13,102 of the population and females 11,814. The major Jat clan in the town is Dhaliwal, Rathore and Waraich. Machhiwara has male literacy is around 77.54% while female 70.56 %

References

Cities and towns in Ludhiana district